Piletosoma novalis is a moth in the family Crambidae. It was described by Francis Walker in 1866. It is found in Brazil.

References

Moths described in 1866
Pyraustinae